Kashino is a rural locality (a village) in Filippovskoye Rural Settlement, Kirzhachsky District, Vladimir Oblast, Russia. The population was 252 as of 2010. There are 9 streets.

Geography 
Kashino is located 32 km south of Kirzhach (the district's administrative centre) by road. Pesyane is the nearest rural locality.

References 

Rural localities in Kirzhachsky District